Martin Schneider  (born 25 May 1964), often just called "Maddin", is a German comedian, cabaret artist and actor.

Biography 
Born in Bad Homburg vor der Höhe, Schneider grew up in Burgholzhausen, a district of Friedrichsdorf. He has a twin sister named Martina. Today, Schneider lives in Marburg.

At first, Schneider did an internship at the Hessischer Rundfunk. That is where he first tried doing cabaret. In 1990, he was given his first stage job. His first programme was Gell, Sie sind spirituell? ("You're spiritual, aren't you?"). Since 1992, Schneider has appeared in Quatsch Comedy Club, which was still a theatre in Hamburg at that time. Later, he appeared in several TV shows such as RTL Samstag Nacht and had guest appearances in 7 Tage, 7 Köpfe and Genial daneben. He was cast member of Comedy Factory (1996/97) on ProSieben. Since 2004, Schneider is best friends with Cordula Stratmann in Sat.1's improvisational comedy show Schillerstraße. Additionally, he played the dwarf "Speedy" in the October 2004 movie 7 Zwerge – Männer allein im Wald  ("7 Dwarves – Men Alone in the Woods") by Otto Waalkes alongside Waalkes, Markus Majowski, Boris Aljinovic, Heinz Hoenig, Ralf Schmitz and Mirco Nontschew. A sequel, 7 Zwerge – Der Wald ist nicht genug ("7 Dwarves – The Woods Are Not Enough"), was released in October 2006.

Schneider is best known for his Hessian dialect. "Aschebeschär" ("Aschenbecher" in Standard German, "ashtray" in English) has become a dictum by him. His characteristics are his quite distinctive face and his big mouth. His manager is Heidrun Buchmaier, companion of Bastian Pastewka.

Schneider released several CDs (Aschebeschär, Sischär is Sischär!, Raggae Mann, Best of Maddin) as well as the book Im Bett mit Maddin ("In Bed with Maddin").

Filmography 

 1999 "Alles Bob" - Everything Bob
 2000 ""
 2001 "Ausziehn!" - Undress!
 2003 "Sperling und der Mann im Abseits" - Sperling and the Kept Aloof (TV)
 2004 "Germanikus" - Germanicus
 2004 "7 Zwerge – Männer allein im Wald" - 7 Dwarves – Men Alone in the Woods
 2004 "Crazy Race 2 – Warum die Mauer wirklich fiel" - Crazy Race 2 – Why The Wall Fell Really (TV)
 2006 "7 Zwerge – Der Wald ist nicht genug" - 7 Dwarves: The Forest Is Not Enough
 2014 "The 7th Dwarf" - Der 7bte Zwerg
 2015 "Kartoffelsalat – Nicht fragen!"

Literature 
 Martin Schneider, Heidrun Buchmaier: "Im Bett mit Maddin" ("In Bed with Maddin"), Kurschus & Zanolli 2003,

External links 

1964 births
Living people
People from Bad Homburg vor der Höhe
German male film actors
German male television actors
German comedians